Putative E3 ubiquitin-protein ligase SH3RF1 is an enzyme that in humans is encoded by the SH3RF1 gene.

Function 

This gene encodes a protein containing an N-terminus RING-finger, four SH3 domains, and a region implicated in binding of the Rho GTPase Rac. Via the RING-finger, the encoded protein has been shown to function as a ubiquitin-protein ligase involved in protein sorting at the trans-Golgi network. The encoded protein may also act as a scaffold for the c-Jun N-terminal kinase signaling pathway, facilitating the formation of a functional signaling module.

Interactions 

SH3RF1 has been shown to interact with AKT2 and MAP3K11.

References

Further reading